"The Big Three Killed My Baby" was released in March 1999 as a 7" single  and is the third track on re-releases of The White Stripes, the eponymous debut of the Detroit-based American garage rock band The White Stripes. A live recording of the song is featured on Under Blackpool Lights; the band's first official DVD release. The single is backed with "Red Bowling Ball Ruth".

"The Big Three" refers to the three major automakers in the 1950s and 1960s: Ford, Chrysler and General Motors, all of which have their headquarters in Detroit. The song is an attack on these companies, relating to the engineering technique of planned obsolescence, and a short-sighted lack of innovation.  Jack White has stated in interviews that he does not believe music to be a viable medium for political messages and didn't write another political song until the 2007 release of "Icky Thump" (which criticizes American immigration policy). The song mentions "Tucker's blood", a reference to Preston Tucker's ill-fated Tucker 48. More recently, The White Stripes have performed the song live with alternate lyrics referring to the Iraq War: "Bush's hands are turning red... and I found out your baby is dead."

The photo that the band is standing in front of on the single's cover has a note on it, which reads "Insert your money here", a reference to the costs of maintaining automobiles which are intentionally engineered to become prematurely obsolete.

Track listing

References

1999 singles
The White Stripes songs
XL Recordings singles
Third Man Records singles
1999 songs
Songs written by Jack White
Protest songs
Songs about Detroit
Wikipedia requested audio of songs